The 2021 European Junior and U23 Canoe Slalom Championships took place in Solkan, Slovenia from 19 to 22 August 2021 under the auspices of the European Canoe Association (ECA). It was the 23rd edition of the competition for Juniors (U18) and the 19th edition for the Under 23 category. Solkan hosted the championships for the 5th time.

A total of 20 medal events were held. It was the first time that Extreme slalom events were part of the European Junior and U23 Championships.

Medal summary

Men

Canoe

Junior

U23

Kayak

Junior

U23

Women

Canoe

Junior

U23

Kayak

Junior

U23

Medal table

References

External links
European Canoe Association

European Junior and U23 Canoe Slalom Championships
European Junior and U23 Canoe Slalom Championships
European Junior and U23 Canoe Slalom Championships
European Junior and U23 Canoe Slalom Championships
European Junior and U23 Canoe Slalom Championships